St Combs is a small fishing village in Aberdeenshire, Scotland, immediately southwest of Inverallochy. It has existed since at least the 17th century, and takes its name from a church to St Colm (or Columba) that used to exist in the area and was abandoned in 1607. Only a fragment of it remains. The remains of Lonmay Castle are also in the area. The village sits across Loch Strathbeg from Rattray.

History
There is considerable evidence of local habitation by early man in and around St Combs. Somewhat to the southwest lies the Catto Long Barrow and a number of tumuli.

The "new toon" of St Combs was laid out in 1784 by Charles Gordon of Cairness. Houses were laid out in large garden plots, gable to the street, running downhill to the shore. Lonmay Parish Church was established in 1787, and Cairness House (the work of James Playfair) followed in the 1790s.

Charlestown, just across the Mill Water and closer to the shore, was founded by the Inverallochy Eastate in 1800. This was much to the chagrin of the St Combs inhabitants, who named it Sodom.

St Combs railway station opened in 1903 and closed in 1965. It was the terminus of a short branch line from Fraserburgh. In 1904 Kirkton Bridge Halt railway station was opened on the line.

Line notes

Sources
Gazetteer for Scotland: St Combs (2008)
Historical overview of St Combs in the Gazetteer for Scotland.
 C. Michael Hogan (2008) Catto Long Barrow fieldnotes, The Modern Antiquarian

Villages in Aberdeenshire
Tumuli in Scotland